Symplocos anamallayana is a species of plant in the family Symplocaceae. It is endemic to India.

References

Endemic flora of India (region)
anamallayana
Endangered plants
Taxonomy articles created by Polbot